Emma Hayman (born 24 February 1988) is a New Zealand tennis player.

Hayman has won one doubles title on the ITF tour in her career. On 4 November 2013, she reached her best singles ranking of world number 686. On 7 July 2014, she peaked at world number 751 in the doubles rankings.

Hayman made her WTA tour debut at the 2013 ASB Classic.

Playing for New Zealand at the Fed Cup, Hayman has a win–loss record of 8–1.

ITF finals (1–0)

Doubles (1–0)

Fed Cup participation

Singles

Doubles

References

External links 
 
 
 

1988 births
Living people
Sportspeople from Durban
New Zealand female tennis players
21st-century New Zealand women